Mauricio Herrera (born May 24, 1980) is an American professional boxer who held the WBA interim super lightweight title in 2014.

Professional career

Herrera turned pro at age 27, signing with Golden Boy Promotions.

On January 7, 2011 Herrera beat then-undefeated Ruslan Provodnikov on ESPN's Friday Night Fights to win the USBA lightweight title.

On March 15, 2014, Herrera lost a majority decision to Danny García in a 12-round championship bout for the WBC, WBA (Super), and The Ring light welterweight titles, with scores of 116–112 for García twice and 114–114. The decision was controversial with some members of the media scoring the bout in favor of Herrera, including Showtime Championship Boxing's broadcasting team.  

On December 13, 2014, Herrera lost a unanimous decision, and his interim WBA light welterweight title, to Jose Benavidez Jr. The HBO commenting team of Max Kellerman, Jim Lampley, and Roy Jones Jr. all agreed that Herrera had won the fight. 

Commenting on the losses to Garcia and Benavidez, Herrara said, "A lot of people think I won those fights against Danny Garcia and Jose Benavidez, and after losing to Benavidez, that kind of hurt a little bit and represented the way things have gone with my career. I was almost forgotten, which is frustrating."

In March 2017, Herrera won a unanimous and majority decision over Hector Velazquez, and in August 2017 repeated the effort against Jesus Soto Karass.

On December 15, 2018, Sadam Ali defeated Herrera by unanimous decision on the Canelo Alvarez-Rocky Fielding undercard at Madison Square Garden.

On May 4, 2019, Vergil Ortiz Jr. defeated Herrera in the third round of the co-feature of the Canelo Alvarez-Daniel Jacobs middleweight title unification fight at T-Mobile Arena in Las Vegas. It was a fight that featured boxers with a 17-year age difference.

Professional boxing record

References

External links

American boxers of Mexican descent
Boxers from California
Light-welterweight boxers
1980 births
Living people
American male boxers
Welterweight boxers
People from Lake Elsinore, California
People from Riverside, California
People from Oxnard, California